The 1986–87 Purdue Boilermakers men's basketball team represented Purdue University during the 1986–87 college basketball season.

Roster

Schedule

|-
!colspan=9 style=|Regular Season

|-
!colspan=9 style=|NCAA Tournament

Rankings

Team players drafted into the NBA

References

Purdue
Purdue
Purdue Boilermakers men's basketball seasons